Shanee Torres Doncel (born 5 December 1997) is a Colombian karateka. 

In 2021, Torres competed in the women's +68 kg event at the World Karate Championships held in Dubai, United Arab Emirates. She won one of the bronze medals in the women's team kumite event. 

Torres won the silver medal in the women's +68 kg event at the 2022 Bolivarian Games held in Valledupar, Colombia. Several months later, she also won the silver medal in same event at the 2022 South American Games held in Asunción, Paraguay.

Achievements

References 

1997 births
Living people
Place of birth missing (living people)
Colombian female karateka
Competitors at the 2018 Central American and Caribbean Games
South American Games silver medalists for Colombia
South American Games medalists in karate
Competitors at the 2022 South American Games
21st-century Colombian women